This is a list of accounting schools in Pakistan, registered with Institute of Chartered Accountants of Pakistan.

Islamabad
 School of Business and management Rawalpindi
  www.sbmrwp.edu.pk
 The Professional Academy of Commerce Islamabad & Rawalpindi
 National College of Business and Management Sciences (NCBMS)
 School of Business and Management 
 SKANS School of Accountancy

Sindh

Karachi
 ARTT Business School
 Al-Hamd
  Tabani's School of Accountancy 
 College of and Management Sciences (CAMS) 
 College of Business Professionals (CBP)
 ESCRIBIR College of Advance Studies 
 ASA Abeel's School of Accounts
 KnS School of Business Studies

Hyderabad
Al-Hamd
Biztech Academy School of Accountancy (BSA)By Qualified Chartered Accountants

Khyber Pakhtunkhwa

Peshawar
 Indus College of Business and Finance 
 Professionals' Academy of Commerce (PAC-P)
 SKANS School of Accountancy

Punjab

Faisalabad
 Online CA Academy, Faisalabad
 ILEX College of Accountancy, Faisalabad (ICA )
 Professionals’ College of Accountancy (PCA)
 TIPS College of Accountancy 
 SKANS School of Accountancy

Gujranwala
 Online CA Academy 
 Professionals' Academy of Commerce 
 SKANS School of Accountancy 
 College of Accounting and Finance (CAF)

Lahore
 College of Accountancy and Professional Studies (CAPS)
 Online CA Academy 
 Professionals' Academy of Commerce (PAC) 
 RISE School of Accountancy 
 SKANS School of Accountancy multan
the millennium universal college

Multan
 Online CA Academy, Multan 
 SKANS School of Accountancy 
 ABC Kampus

Rawalpindi
 School of Business and management Rawalpindi(SBM) (www.sbmrwp.edu.pk)
 The Professional Academy of Commerce Islamabad & Rawalpindi
 SKANS School of Accountancy
 Wah College of Accountancy

References

List at ICAP